Henry or Harry Cook may refer to:

 Henry Caldwell Cook (1886–1939), British educator
 Henry Francis Cook (1855–?), American manufacturer and financier
 Henry Lucas Cook (died 1928), Archdeacon of Craven, 1913–1928
 Harry Cook (actor) (born 1991), Australian actor, writer and LGBTQ activist
 Henry Cook (aviator), early British aviator and Royal Artillery officer
 Henry Cook (footballer) (1893–1917), English footballer
 Harry Cook (footballer) (born 1914), Scottish footballer
 Harry Cook (martial artist) (Henry Wilson Cook, born 1949), British martial artist, teacher, and author

See also 
 Harold Cook (disambiguation)
 Henry Cooke (disambiguation)